Ireland competed at the 2011 World Aquatics Championships in Shanghai, China between July 16 and 31, 2011.

Open water swimming

Men

Swimming

Ireland qualified 5 swimmers.

Men

Women

References

2011 in Irish sport
Nations at the 2011 World Aquatics Championships
Ireland at the World Aquatics Championships